The Women's K-4 1000m event at the 2010 South American Games was held over March 27 at 11:00.

Medalists

Results

References
Final

1000m K-4 Women